Susan Pedersen may refer to:

Susan Pedersen (historian) (born 1959), historian at Columbia University
Susan Pedersen (swimmer) (born 1953), American Olympic silver medalist in swimming